Jason Mendoza may refer to:

 Jason Mendoza (The Good Place character)
 "Jason Mendoza" (The Good Place episode)